The Gutenberg Prize of the International Gutenberg Society and the City of Mainz has been awarded since 1968 for outstanding artistic, technical and scientific achievements in the field of printing. The award was initially awarded every three years, since 1994 then in annual change with the Gutenberg Prize of the City of Leipzig, which also honors outstanding book art achievements. The Gutenberg Prize is endowed with 10,000 euros.

Winners

References 

 Gutenberg Prize, Internationale Gutenberg-Gesellschaft in Mainz e.V.

Awards established in 1968
Arts awards in Germany
Book art awards
Municipal awards
Mainz